Philippe Di Folco (born 20 June 1964 in Choisy-le-Roi) is a French author and teacher.

Biography 
Born and raised in Val de Marne, near Paris, France, Philippe Di Folco studied Economics and Literature at School for Advanced Studies in the Social Sciences (Paris).

From 1988 to 1997, he was an academic publishing production manager for several companies such as Addison-Wesley.

He met Jean-François Bizot, CEO of Novapress in 1997, writing and producing for magazines and radio.

In 2003, he was invited to The Frye Festival.

He is co-author of On Tour with  Mathieu Amalric: the film won an award at the 2010 Cannes Film Festival. Di Folco was nominated for the César Award for Best Writing 2010.

Since 2010, he has been teaching creative writing at École Estienne, Le Havre Art School...

He is the author in 2014 of the first biography about the French millionnaire Jacques Lebaudy, the "Emperor of the Sahara", who was shot by his wife in Long Island in 1919.

He is co-author of Barbara with Mathieu Amalric: they were nominated for the César Award for Best Writing 2018.

Selected bibliography

 2005: Dictionnaire de la Pornographie (Dictionary of Pornography), Paris: Presses Universitaires de France, foreword: Jean-Claude Carrière, translated into Greek, Romanian, Italian 
 2008: We Love Books! A World Tour, Échirolles: Centre Européen du Graphisme 
 2010: Dictionnaire de la Mort (Dictionary of Death), Paris: Éditions Larousse 
 2011: Petit traité de l'imposture (About Imposture), Paris: Éditions Larousse 
 2014: L'Empereur du Sahara (a biography of Jacques Lebaudy), Paris: Galaade Editions, 
 2014: Criminels. Histoires vraies, Paris: Sonatine éditions/Perrin,

Academic conference 
2009: Traduire l'Éros / Translating Eros, Montreal, Concordia University Press

References 

1964 births
Living people
People from Choisy-le-Roi
21st-century French novelists
French translators
French food writers
French non-fiction writers
French male screenwriters
French screenwriters
French male novelists
21st-century French male writers
French male non-fiction writers
21st-century French screenwriters
21st-century translators